Lake Wateree State Park is a state park located in Ridgeway, South Carolina. The state park is located on Desportes Island on Lake Wateree, 17 miles from Winnsboro SC and 14 miles from Ridgeway SC. The  site was acquired by the state in 1982 and offers 100 camping sites, picnic shelters, an on-site tackle shop with boat refueling, and a mile-long nature tail.

The park was formerly known as Lake Wateree State Recreation Area.

External links
 Lake Wateree State Park

State parks of South Carolina
Protected areas of Fairfield County, South Carolina